Donald Leroy Landrum (February 16, 1936 – January 9, 2003) was an American professional baseball outfielder, who played in Major League Baseball (MLB) for the Philadelphia Phillies, St. Louis Cardinals, Chicago Cubs, and San Francisco Giants, from  to .

Early life
Landrum was born on February 16, 1936, in Santa Rosa, California. He attended Mount Diablo High School in Concord, California.

Baseball career

Philadelphia Phillies
Originally signed by the Philadelphia Phillies as an amateur free agent in 1954, Landrum made his major league debut with the Phils on September 28, 1957, against the Brooklyn Dodgers. He played in just two games for the Quakers, appearing in both games as the team’s starting center fielder at Philadelphia’s Connie Mack Stadium.

St. Louis Cardinals
From 1960 to mid-way through the 1962 season, Landrum played for the St. Louis Cardinals, during which times he appeared in only 73 games, with a batting average of .227. On June 5, 1962, Landrum was traded to the Chicago Cubs.

Chicago Cubs
Landrum may be best-remembered for his time with the Cubs. But he batted a meager .226 with six home runs and 34 runs batted in (RBI).

San Francisco Giants
Landrum was traded to his hometown San Francisco Giants at year's end, along with pitcher Lindy McDaniel for pitcher Bill Hands and catcher Randy Hundley. While Hands and Hundley would become key members of the Cubs' contending teams under manager Leo Durocher in the late 1960s, Landrum's professional career ended after the  season.

For his career, Landrum appeared in 456 MLB games, with 1,160 at-bats and 272 hits for a .234 lifetime batting mark.

After baseball
In retirement, Landrum worked in various businesses in East Contra Costa County. He was an avid San Francisco Giants and 49ers fan. Landrum enjoyed playing Pinochle and collecting baseball cards. More than anything, he enjoyed spending time with his family and grandchildren.

Death
On January 9, 2003, Landrum died at his Pittsburg, California home, at the age of 66.

Fascinating facts
 Despite Landrum’s relatively scant MLB career, it’s somewhat astonishing that he broke up four late-inning no-hitters. The four unlucky pitchers are Sandy Koufax, Jim Maloney, Vern Law, and Bob Friend.
 Landrum’s 1963 Topps baseball card #113 actually portrays a photo of Cubs legend Ron Santo (an uncorrected error / UER).
 Landrum’s 1966 Topps baseball card #43 has three variations (all concerning the positioning of a button on the fly on his uniform pants).

References

External links

1936 births
2003 deaths
Baseball players from California
Bradford Phillies players
Buffalo Bisons (minor league) players
Chicago Cubs players
Major League Baseball outfielders
Mattoon Phillies players
Miami Marlins (IL) players
Reidsville Phillies players
Philadelphia Phillies players
Phoenix Giants players
Portland Beavers players
St. Louis Cardinals players
Salt Lake City Bees players
San Francisco Giants players
Schenectady Blue Jays players
Sportspeople from Santa Rosa, California
People from Pittsburg, California